Chanda is a Pakistani Urdu-language film that was released on 3 August 1962 in Pakistan. It stars Rehman and Sultana Zaman in lead roles. It is the first Urdu-language film to be produced in East Pakistan (now Bangladesh). It was also Shabnam's Urdu-language film debut.

Cast
 Rehman
 Sultana Zaman
 Shabnam
 Golam Mustafa
 Subhash Dutta
 Rani Sarker

Music

Release
Chanda was released on 3 August 1962, six years of the release of  Mukh O Mukhosh,the first feature film of East Pakistan. J.C. Anand distributed the film in Punjab and North-West Frontier Province through his distribution company Eveready Pictures. Anis Dosani arranged to distribute the film in other provinces and territories of Pakistan on a commission basis. Chanda was shown in movie theatres for 25 weeks.

Reception
Chanda was a commercial success in Pakistan and became a hit. According to Anupam Hayat, the film ushered in a new era in Pakistan. It changed the fate of Dhallywood positively. Film director Azizur Rahman criticized the poster of the film. He said the film's main theme is not presented in the poster.

Bengali filmmaker Alamgir Kabir said about Chanda in 1969:

Accolades

References

Citation

Bibliography

External links

1962 drama films
Urdu-language Pakistani films
Urdu-language Bangladeshi films
1960s Urdu-language films
Bangladeshi romantic drama films
Films scored by Robin Ghosh
Films directed by Ehtesham
Nigar Award winners
Films shot in Bangladesh